Perognathus is a genus of pocket mouse.  Like other members of their family they are more closely related to pocket gophers than to true mice.

Characteristics
The silky pocket mice are small animals with soft pelage, long tails, and small feet compared to other heteromyids.  They have long claws which are used for digging burrows and sifting sandy substrates for seeds.  They have also been found to steal seeds from kangaroo rats' dens.  They store these seeds in large hairy external cheek pouches.  They are nocturnal and are found in arid habitats.  They are not true hibernators, but will go into torpor and stay in their burrows for extended periods of time.

Species

Perognathus alticola — White-eared pocket mouse
Perognathus amplus — Arizona pocket mouse
Perognathus fasciatus — Olive-backed pocket mouse
Perognathus flavescens — Plains pocket mouse
Perognathus flavus — Silky pocket mouse
Perognathus inornatus — San Joaquin pocket mouse, endemic to California.
Perognathus longimembris — Little pocket mouse, native to Northwestern Mexico, California, and the Southwestern United States.
Perognathus longimembris pacificus — Pacific pocket mouse, an endangered species endemic to coastal Southern California.
Perognathus merriami — Merriam's pocket mouse
Perognathus parvus — Great Basin pocket mouse, native to the Great Basin region.

Sometimes members of the genus Chaetodipus are placed in Perognathus.

Footnotes

References
Duff, A. and A. Lawson. 2004. Mammals of the World A Checklist. New Haven, Yale University Press.
Nowak, Ronald M. 1999. Walker's Mammals of the World, 6th edition. Johns Hopkins University Press, 1936 pp. 

 
Rodent genera
Rodents of North America
Mammals described in 1839
Taxa named by Prince Maximilian of Wied-Neuwied